Geocomposite is a composition / combination of two or more geosynthetic materials to perform multiple number of geosynthetic functions for specific civil engineering application(s) the purpose of providing this composition is to minimize the application costs whereas the technical properties of the soil or the geotechnical structure are enhanced.

There are five basic functions that can be provided: separation, reinforcement, filtration, drainage, and containment.

Geotextile-geonet composites
When a geotextile is used on one or both sides of a geonet, the separation and filtration functions are always satisfied, but the drainage function is vastly improved in comparison to geotextiles by themselves. Such geocomposites are regularly used in intercepting and conveying leachate in landfill liner and cover systems and for conducting vapor or water beneath pond liners of various types. These drainage geocomposites also make excellent drains to intercept water in a capillary zone where frost heave or salt migration is a problem. In all cases, the liquid enters through the geotextile and then travels horizontally within the geonet to a suitable exit.

Geotextile-geomembrane composites
Geotextiles can be laminated on one or both sides of a geomembrane for a number of purposes. The geotextiles provide increased resistance to puncture, tear propagation, and friction related to sliding, as well as providing tensile strength in and of themselves. Quite often, however, the geotextiles are of the nonwoven, needle-punched variety and are of relatively heavy weight. In such cases the geotextile component acts as a drainage media, since its in-plane transmissivity feature can conduct water, leachate or gases away from direct contact with the geomembrane.

Geomembrane-geogrid composites
Since some types of geomembranes and geogrids can be made from the same material (e.g., high-density polyethylene), they can be bonded together to form an impervious membrane barrier with enhanced strength and friction capabilities.

Geotextile-geogrid composites
A needle punched nonwoven geotextile bonded to a geogrid provides in-plane drainage while the geogrid provides tensile reinforcement. Such geotextile-geogrid composites are used for internal drainage of low-permeability backfill soils for reinforced walls and slopes. The synergistic properties of each component enhances the behavior of the final product.

Geotextile-polymer core composites
A core in the form of a quasi-rigid plastic sheet, it can be extruded or deformed in such a way as to allow very large quantities of liquid to flow within its structure; it thus acts as a drainage core. The core must be protected by a geotextile, acting as a filter and separator, on one or both sides. Various systems are available, each focused on a particular application. The first is known as wick drains in the U.S. and prefabricated vertical drains, PVDs, in Europe. The 100 mm wide by 5 mm thick polymer cores are often fluted for ease of conducting water. A geotextile acting as a filter and separator is socked around the core. The emergence of such wick drains, or PVDs, has all but eliminated traditional sand drains as a rapid means of consolidating fine-grained saturated cohesive soils.

The second type is in the form of drainage panels, the rigid polymer core being nubbed, columned, dimpled or a three-dimensional net. With a geotextile on one side it makes an excellent drain on the backfilled side of retaining walls, basement walls and plaza decks. The cores are sometimes vacuum formed dimples or stiff 3-D meshes. As with wick drains, the geotextile is the filter/separator and the thick polymer core is the drain. Many systems of this type are available, the latest addition having a thin pliable geomembrane on the side facing the wall and functioning as a vapor barrier.

The third type within this area of drainage geocomposites is the category of prefabricated edge drains. These materials, typically 500 mm high by 20 to 30 mm wide are placed adjacent to a highway pavement, airfield pavement, or railroad right-of-way, for lateral drainage out of and away from the pavement section. The systems are very rapid in their installation and extremely cost effective.

References

Geosynthetics